Aalmi Majlis Tahaffuz Khatm-e-Nubuwwat is an international Islamic organization. Founded by Syed Ata Ullah Shah Bukhari in 1954 in Multan when Majlis-e-Ahrar-e-Islam was banned due to Khatm-e-Nubuwwat movement of 1953, Pakistan as a non-political missionary organization. He was elected the first Emir. The incumbent Emir is Nasiruddin Khakwani. In 1974 Tehreek e Khatam e Nabuwat under the guidance of AMTKN as a result, the National Assembly unanimously amended the constitution to declare the Ahmadi religious community a non-Muslim minority.

Emirs
 Syed Ata Ullah Shah Bukhari (1954–1961)
 Qazi Ahsan Ahmed Shuja Abadi
 Muhammad Ali Jalandhari
 Lal Hussain Akhtar
 Maulana Muhammad Hayat (acting Emir)
 Muhammad Yousuf Banuri (1974–1977)
 Khawaja Khan Muhammad (1977–2010)
 Abdul Majeed Ludhianvi (2010–2015)
 Abdur Razzaq Iskander (2015–2021)
 Nasiruddin Khakwani (2021–Present)

Publications
 Khatm-e-Nubuwwat (Weekly Magazine)
 Laulak (Monthly Magazine)

See also 
 List of Deobandi organisations

References

External links
  Official Website
  Central Website

1949 establishments in Pakistan
Islamic organisations based in Pakistan
Islam in Pakistan
Sunni Islamic movements
Aalmi Majlis Tahaffuz Khatm-e-Nubuwwat
Deobandi organisations